Gottfried von Cramm defeated Fred Perry 6–0, 2–6, 6–2, 2–6, 6–0 in the final to win the men's singles tennis title at the 1936 French Championships.

Seeds
The seeded players are listed below. Gottfried von Cramm is the champion; others show the round in which they were eliminated.

  Fred Perry (finalist)
  Gottfried von Cramm (champion)
  Bunny Austin (quarterfinals)
  Christian Boussus (semifinals)
  Henner Henkel (third round)
  Marcel Bernard (semifinals)
  Bernard Destremau (quarterfinals)
  Kho Sin-Kie (fourth round)
  Kay Lund (third round)
  Frank Herbert David Wilde (second round)
  Dragutin Mitić (first round)
  Charles Edgar Hare (fourth round)
  Adam Baworowski (fourth round)
  Georg Von Metaxa (third round)
  Jacques Brugnon (second round)
  André Martin-Legeay (fourth round)

Draw

Key
 Q = Qualifier
 WC = Wild card
 LL = Lucky loser
 r = Retired

Finals

Earlier rounds

Section 1

Section 2

Section 3

Section 4

Section 5

Section 6

Section 7

Section 8

References

External links
   on the French Open website

1936 in French tennis
1936